The Coupe de la Ligue Final 2008 was a football match that was held at the Stade de France in Saint-Denis on March 29, 2008. It was contested between Paris Saint-Germain and RC Lens. It was PSG's 4th appearance in the final. They won the inaugural cup in 1995, won again in 1998, and lost to FC Gueugnon in the 2000 final. It was Lens's 2nd appearance in the final. They won the cup in their only appearance back in 1999.

After an opening goal from Pauleta, Lens secured an equalising goal just after halftime from Eric Carrière. With extra time looming, PSG striker Péguy Luyindula was hauled down by Hilton in the penalty area, which resulted in the referee pointing to the spot. Bernard Mendy would convert giving PSG their 3rd Coupe de la Ligue title and also giving them a spot in the UEFA Cup.

Lens mayor Guy Delcourt wanted the match to be replayed after a PSG fan unfurled a comical banner midway through the game. The match was not replayed, but PSG were fined and penalized. One of the penalties being that they would be unable to participate in next's year League Cup, however this was later overturned on appeal.

Road to the final

Match details

References

External links

Coupe de La Ligue Official Homepage
Coupe de la Ligue Final Draw

Coupe de la Ligue Finals
Final
Coupe de la Ligue Final 2008
Coupe de la Ligue Final 2008
Coupe De La Ligue Final
Sport in Saint-Denis, Seine-Saint-Denis
Football competitions in Paris
Coupe De La Ligue Final